Evelyn Rosmeri Núñez Fuentes (born April 9, 1971 in Guatemala City) is a female Guatemalan race walker. In 2006, she set a personal best time of 46:19.48 by winning the silver medal at the Ibero-American Championships in Ponce, Puerto Rico. She is also the mother of Jamy Franco, who ended the nation's 56-year drought by taking the race walk title at the 2011 Pan American Games in Guadalajara, Mexico.

At age thirty-seven, Núñez made her official debut for the 2008 Summer Olympics in Beijing, where she competed in the women's 20 km race walk. She finished and completed the race in forty-third place by three minutes behind Latvia's Jolanta Dukure, with the slowest time of 1:44:13.

References

External links

NBC Olympics Profile

1971 births
Living people
Guatemalan female racewalkers
Olympic athletes of Guatemala
Athletes (track and field) at the 2008 Summer Olympics
Sportspeople from Guatemala City
Central American and Caribbean Games medalists in athletics
20th-century Guatemalan women
21st-century Guatemalan women